The  International Centre for Black Sea Studies  (Greek: Διεθνές Κέντρο Μελετών Ευξείνου Πόντου, English Acronym: ICBSS, Greek Acronym: ΔΙΚΕΜΕΠ) is a think-tank based in Athens, Greece, committed to promoting multilateral cooperation between the countries of the Black Sea region and with their international partners.

History and Identity 

The ICBSS was established in 1998 as a private non-profit organisation under Greek law (art. 50 paragraph 2 of L. 2594/1998, Government Gazette 62-A’, as modified by Presidential Decrees No 137 & 138, Government Gazette No.119, 1st issue, April 2000). The centre is a de facto related body of the intergovernmental Organization of the Black Sea Economic Cooperation (BSEC) and forms part of the so-called “BSEC family” of institutions.

The ICBSS was created originally to contribute through policy-oriented research and advocacy work to the realisation of the goals of the BSEC and continues to act as the BSEC's acknowledged think-tank. Aside from the mandates received from the BSEC the centre also carries out a range of projects and activities on its own initiative, aiming to foster multilateral cooperation in and with the wider Black Sea region. A special focus lies on relations with the European Union.

Objectives 

Through its activities, the ICBSS aims to foster multilateral cooperation among the BSEC member states as well as with their international partners.

As an independent research and training centre the ICBSS strives “to pursue applied, policy-oriented research, build capacity and promote knowledge on the Black Sea region both within and outside its boundaries”.

As a related body of the BSEC its goal is "to fulfil in the best possible way its institutional role and the assignments received by carrying out studies, offering policy advice and coordinating activities”.

In 2008, undergoing a review of its image on the occasion of its 10th anniversary, the Centre coined the motto: “Promoting Synergies Across Regions”.

Activities 

To fulfil its mission the Centre carries out applied, policy-oriented research either independently or in its capacity as a related body of the BSEC. While it is not restricted in its thematic scope the ICBSS has so far focused on the following thematic areas:

BSEC-EU interaction
security/stability
energy
good governance and institutional renewal
comparative studies in regional cooperation
cooperation in science and technology
economic development

Research supporting on these topics is pursued in-house, through external experts and/or in collaboration with other institutions. It feeds into the centre's projects, publications, events, and advocacy activities.

Programmes 

ICBSS Annual Conference: an international forum bringing together researchers and policy practitioners to discuss matters of high relevance affecting the state and future of the Black Sea region.
ICBSS Annual Lecture: an event open to the general public featuring expert guest speakers who impart their perspective on topics pertinent to the Black Sea region.
International Black Sea Symposium (IBSS): launched in 2008, the IBSS aims to provide a multicultural and interdisciplinary forum for study, dialogue and networking bringing together young professionals from the wider Black Sea region, EU member states, the US and Central Asia. Symposium participants follow a programme of interactive sessions and workshops on Black Sea related topics led by prominent speakers.
Black Sea Research Network (BSRN): a network of policy-oriented research institutes focusing on the wider Black Sea region that aims to foster collaboration and concerted action through joint projects, pooling of resources as well as information and best practices exchange.
Task Force on a Joint Black Sea Strategy: an international group of experts convening regularly in order to ultimately produce a joint strategy for the development of the Black Sea region with a special focus on its security and socio-economic components.
ICBSS Outreach Programme: a series of open or closed roundtable and panel discussions engaging experts and local stakeholders in debates on regional policy issues.

Projects 

Aside from its ongoing programmes, the centre is also undertaking a range of one-off projects of limited duration often carried out with the collaboration of international partners and usually receiving external funding. The centre has been in particular involved in a number of large-scale EU co-funded projects aiming to foster cooperation and policy coordination in the fields of Science and Technology:

S&T International Cooperation Network for Eastern European and Central Asian Countries (IncoNet EECA): ongoing 
S&T International Cooperation Network for Central Asian and South Caucasus Countries (IncoNet CA/SC): ongoing 
Black Sea ERA-Net: ongoing 
Action Plan in Science and Technology for the Black Sea region (Action Plan-BS): closed 
Research Potential of the Black Sea countries (BS-ResPot): closed 

Other projects include:
Commission on the Black Sea: involving scholars and stakeholders from the region and beyond, the commission was created to produce a comprehensive policy-oriented study on the future of the Black Sea region and formulate policy recommendations addressed to key stakeholders.
EU-Black Sea Observatory: political and economic developments in the Black Sea region are monitored and analysed by means of policy research, media monitoring and other related activities with the primary focus lying on the EU's policies towards the area.

Publications 

The ICBSS produces the following publication series:
Xenophon Papers: comprehensive, policy-oriented studies on key issues, with some volumes also available in Greek translation from Papazisis Publishers, Athens
ICBSS Policy Briefs: electronic commentaries on topical subjects
Black Sea Monitor: source documents on regional affairs

In addition to its series, the Centre occasionally produces books and other publications, while ICBSS staff members contribute to edited volumes, journals and a range of online and offline media. The centre's publications are available free of charge from its website and can also be consulted in its in-house library as part of a collection of publications on Black Sea related topics.

Advocacy  

As a think-tank the ICBSS produces policy-oriented research in the areas of its expertise designed to provide decision-makers and other stakeholders with information and analysis for evidence-based decision-making. In its capacity as a related body of the BSEC the Centre participates in the deliberations of the Organisation's decision-making and subsidiary organs and related bodies, mainly in a consultative role. Upon specific mandates, it drafts policy documents offering policy advice and is engaged in various working groups.

Structure 

The ICBSS is overseen by a Board of Directors comprised by representatives from all twelve member states of the BSEC as well as the Secretary General of the BSEC Permanent International Secretariat, the Director General and Alternate Director General of the ICBSS, and three floating chairs for persons of high international standing.

Managed by the ICBSS’ Director General with the assistance of the Alternate Director General, the ICBSS team consists of 10-15 staff working on the premises and a pool of external experts and collaborators appointed on a project basis.

Partners 

The centre has established a network of international partners including the following “special partners”:
The Bridge magazine
Economic Policy Research Foundation of Turkey (TEPAV)
EU-Russia Centre
European Studies Institute – Moscow State Institute of International Relations
Harvard Black Sea Security Program
Hellenic Foundation for European and Foreign Policy (ELIAMEP)
International Relations and Security Network (ISN)
Istanbul Bilgi University – European Institute.

Resources 

The Government of the Hellenic Republic supports the centre's operation and development. Additional funding is obtained through research contracts, grants and voluntary contributions of BSEC member states and other donors.

See also 
 Organization of the Black Sea Economic Cooperation (BSEC)
 Black Sea Trade and Development Bank (BSTDB)
 International Centre for Black Sea Studies (ICBSS)

References

External links 
 

Geopolitics
Political science
Think tanks established in 1998
Think tanks based in Greece